Northville may refer to several places:

In Canada:
 Northville, Ontario, a community in municipality of Lambton Shores

In the United States:
 Northville Township, LaSalle County, Illinois
 Northville, Michigan
 Northville Township, Michigan
 Northville, Fulton County, New York
 Northville, Suffolk County, New York
 Northville, Ohio
 Northville, South Dakota